Robert Peter Turner (born 18 September 1966) is an English former professional footballer, born in Easington, County Durham, who played as a striker for Huddersfield Town, Cardiff City, Hartlepool United, Bristol Rovers, Wimbledon, Bristol City, Plymouth Argyle, Notts County, Shrewsbury Town, Exeter City, Cambridge United and Hull City in the Football League, and for Taunton Town and Newton Abbot in non-league football. He is the younger brother of goalkeeper John Turner.

References

External links
 
 

1966 births
Living people
Sportspeople from Easington, County Durham
Footballers from County Durham
English footballers
Association football forwards
Huddersfield Town A.F.C. players
Cardiff City F.C. players
Hartlepool United F.C. players
Bristol Rovers F.C. players
Wimbledon F.C. players
Bristol City F.C. players
Plymouth Argyle F.C. players
Notts County F.C. players
Shrewsbury Town F.C. players
Exeter City F.C. players
Cambridge United F.C. players
Hull City A.F.C. players
Taunton Town F.C. players
Newton Abbot A.F.C. players
English Football League players